Ishaq Kayode Rafiu (born 16 December 2000) is a Nigerian professional footballer who plays as a winger for Slovenian PrvaLiga side Maribor.

Club career

Early career
Rafiu made his senior debut for Shooting Stars in the Nigeria Professional Football League during the 2017 season, making two appearances. After a brief spell with Remo Stars in 2019, he joined Rivers United before the 2019–20 season. During the 2021–22 season, Rafiu scored 14 goals and provided 3 assists for Rivers United, helping his team to clinch the league title. Overall, he made 60 appearances and scored 15 league goals for Rivers United over the course of three seasons.

Maribor
On 26 July 2022, reigning Slovenian PrvaLiga champions Maribor announced that they had signed Rafiu on a three-year contract. However, the next day, Rivers United made it clear that his contract with the club is still valid and that any transaction to another club without their consent is null and void. Almost two months later, on 13 September, his transfer to Maribor was finally completed after all the necessary documents were obtained. He made his debut for Maribor in the 13th round of the 2022–23 Slovenian PrvaLiga season on 15 October 2022 against Olimpija Ljubljana, when he replaced Andraž Žinič late in the match. A few days later, he scored his first goal for the club in a 9–0 victory over lower league side Limbuš-Pekre in the Slovenian Cup.

International career
Rafiu made his international debut for Nigeria in a friendly match against Mexico on 28 May 2022.

Honours
Rivers United
Nigeria Professional Football League: 2021–22

References

External links
Soccerway profile

2000 births
Living people
Nigerian footballers
Nigeria international footballers
Association football wingers
Shooting Stars S.C. players
Remo Stars F.C. players
Rivers United F.C. players
NK Maribor players
Nigeria Professional Football League players
Slovenian PrvaLiga players
Nigerian expatriate footballers
Nigerian expatriate sportspeople in Slovenia
Expatriate footballers in Slovenia